The Armenian Esports Federation (AEF), is the regulating body of esports in Armenia, governed by the Armenian Olympic Committee. The headquarters of the federation is located in Yerevan.

History 
The Armenian Esports Federation was established in 2018 and is currently led by President Smbat Siradeghyan. The Federation oversees the training of esports specialists and is responsible for the development of esports in the country. The Federation organizes Armenia's participation in European and international esports competitions, including the World Cyber Games. The Federation also organizes national online tournaments and educational seminars. The Federation is a full member of the International Esports Federation, the Global Esports Federation, the World Esports Consortium, and the European Esports Federation.

See also 
 Sport in Armenia

References

External links 
 Armenian Esports Federation official website
 Armenian Esports Federation on Facebook

Sports governing bodies in Armenia
Esports governing bodies
Sports organizations established in 2018